The yellow-tinted honeyeater (Ptilotula flavescens) is a species of bird in the family Meliphagidae.
It is found in Australia and Papua New Guinea.
Its natural habitats are subtropical or tropical moist lowland forests and subtropical or tropical mangrove forests.

The yellow-tinted honeyeater was previously included in the genus Lichenostomus, but was moved to Ptilotula after a molecular phylogenetic analysis, published in 2011, showed that the original genus was polyphyletic.

Gallery

References

yellow-tinted honeyeater
Birds of the Northern Territory
Birds of Cape York Peninsula
Birds of Papua New Guinea
yellow-tinted honeyeater
Taxonomy articles created by Polbot